Camden Big Picture Learning Academy (formerly MetEast High School) is a four-year public high school in the City of Camden, in Camden County, New Jersey, United States, serving students in ninth through twelfth grades as part of the Camden City Public Schools. The school opened in 2005 in conjunction with Big Picture Learning as an effort to prepare students for success in college through greater community involvement and mentoring.

As of the 2021–22 school year, the school had an enrollment of 122 students and 15.5 classroom teachers (on an FTE basis), for a student–teacher ratio of 7.9:1. There were 77 students (63.1% of enrollment) eligible for free lunch and 3 (2.5% of students) eligible for reduced-cost lunch.

Awards, recognition and rankings
The school was the 285th-ranked public high school in New Jersey out of 328 schools statewide in New Jersey Monthly magazine's September 2012 cover story on the state's "Top Public High Schools", after being ranked 211th in 2010 out of 322 schools listed.

Notable alumni
 Brad Hawkins (born 1998), American football safety, who played for the New England Patriots of the National Football League.

References

External links 
Camden Big Picture Learning Academy
Camden City Public Schools

School Data for the Camden City Public Schools, National Center for Education Statistics

2005 establishments in New Jersey
Educational institutions established in 2005
High schools in Camden, New Jersey
Public high schools in Camden County, New Jersey